Moses Bull (January 15, 1830 – December 29, 1896) was an American politician in the state of Washington. He served in the Washington House of Representatives from 1895 to 1897, alongside W. S. Johnston.

References

Republican Party members of the Washington House of Representatives
1830 births
1896 deaths
19th-century American politicians